Godlen Herschelle Derrick Masimla (born 11 August 1992 in Wellington) is a South African rugby union player for  in the Currie Cup and the Rugby Challenge. His regular position is scrum-half or winger.

Career

Youth and Varsity rugby

After appearing for the  side at the 2010 Under-18 Craven Week tournament, Masimla moved to Johannesburg to join the  side in 2011.

He also played for the  side in the Under-21 Provincial Championship competitions in 2012 and 2013, helping them two finals in each season and winning the title in 2013.

Western Province

In 2013, Masimla was included in the  squad for the 2013 Vodacom Cup competition.

In 2014, Masimla was selected in the  wider training group prior to the 2014 Super Rugby season and subsequently in the final squad. However, a serious wrist injury sustained in the opening match of the 2014 Vodacom Cup competition against the  ruled him out of any involvement with the Super Rugby side.

References

South African rugby union players
Living people
1992 births
People from Wellington, Western Cape
Stormers players
Western Province (rugby union) players
Southern Kings players
Rugby union scrum-halves
Rugby union players from the Western Cape